A saltwater battery is a type of battery that uses a mixture of salt and water as its electrolyte. Unlike traditional batteries, saltwater batteries are safer to use because they are non-flammable and environmental friendly. This makes them an eco-friendly energy storage solution.

History 

In 2008, Carnegie Mellon professor Jay Whitacre founded Aquion Energy and received venture funding from Kleiner Perkins Caufield and Byers. He won the 2015 Lemelson–MIT Prize, an award worth $500,000, for inventing the company's saltwater battery. They are the first and only battery manufacturers to have met the stringent criteria to obtain Cradle-to-Cradle (Bronze) certification. The company raised $190 million in equity and debt before going bankrupt in 2017, and was then acquired by a Chinese company later that year for slightly under $10 million.

Design

Aquion Energy 
Aquion Energy's batteries are classified as standard products with no special handling required in shipment. It has robust to variable cycling profiles and long-duration intervals while partially charged. Its life is not reduced by side reactions while in idle and maintenance cycling to maintain performance/life is unnecessary. Its optimal operating temperature range is -5 °C to 40 °C and is affected by operational temperature swings. It operates without auxiliary loads or an external power supply. Its chemistry is not susceptible to thermal runaway. Active thermal management is generally not required, except given extreme ambient temperature. Its mechanical materials can be recycled in normal recycling streams. Chemical materials can be disposed of without special equipment or containers.

Water in salt 
A different design used an electrolyte that has a salt-to-water ratio of six to one, nearly saturated, such that it could also be called a water in salt battery.

Solid-electrolyte interphase 

In November 2015, researchers from the University of Maryland and the Army Research Laboratory claimed that they had induced the cell to form a Solid-electrolyte interphase (SEI), a first for an aqueous electrolyte. The SEI allows the aqueous lithium-ion battery to operate at high voltages and self-discharge slowly. The high salt concentration allows the interphase to form. It raised the maximum voltage for such a battery from 1.23 V to around 3 V. At 2.4V, the battery's specific energy was approximately 100 watt-hour/kg and it displayed consistent performance over 1,000 charge/discharge cycles.  The device operated with nearly 100% coulombic efficiency at both low (0.15 C) and high (4.5 C) discharge and charge rates.

In September 2017, researchers stated they were able to raise the voltage to 4.0 volts.

In May 2019, researchers published an article where the voltage increased to 4.2 volts.  High specific capacity from a densely packed stage-I graphite intercalation compound of C3.5[Br0.5Cl0.5] can form reversibly in water-in-bisalt electrolyte. By coupling this cathode with a passivized graphite anode, a cell can achieve an energy density of 460 watt-hours per kilogram of the total composite electrode and about 100 percent coulombic efficiency.

See also 

 Flow battery
 Ionic liquid
 Molten salt battery
 nanoFlowcell
 Sodium-ion battery
 Sodium-sulfur battery
 Voltaic pile

References 

Battery types